Palazzo Dalla Torre is a patrician palace in Verona, northern Italy, designed by Italian Renaissance architect Andrea Palladio for Giambattista Dalla Torre. The palazzo was probably built from 1555, but remained unfinished. Allied bombardment in 1945 demolished a great part of the building. However, conspicuous remains of Palladio’s construction survive: the majestic access portal and a courtyard with columns and entablature.

History
Palladio’s only work in the city of Verona, Palazzo Dalla Torre is somewhat of a mystery. If the dating is uncertain (the majority of scholars dates the beginning of construction to 1555), equally vague is our knowledge of the building’s actual form. This was only partially executed and can be reconstructed, therefore, only from the plate in the I quattro libri dell'architettura (1570), in this case particularly unfaithful.

Patron
There are no doubts, however, about the identity of the patron, Giambattista Dalla Torre. Tied by familial bonds to the Vicentine Valmarana and Marcantonio Thiene (who commissioned his family palace from Palladio, Palazzo Thiene), he was a friend of intellectuals and artists; above all Giangiorgio Trissino, but also the great geographer Giambattista Ramusio, the doctor Giovanni Fracastoro and the architect Michele Sanmicheli.

Sources

External links
Palazzo Dalla Torre in the CISA website 

Houses completed in 1555
Della Torre
Renaissance architecture in Verona
Andrea Palladio buildings
Dalla Torre family